Shaanxi Province Stadium, also known as Zhuque Stadium because it is located near Zhuque Square, is a multi-use stadium in Xi'an, China. It is used mainly for football matches and athletics events.  The stadium has a capacity of 50,000 people. It was named Coca-Cola Stadium from 2005 to 2007.

References

Buildings and structures in Xi'an
Sports venues in Shaanxi
Football venues in China
Sport in Xi'an
Sports venues completed in 1999
1999 establishments in China